Danilo Gregorić (1900–1957) or Gregorič (Грегорич) was a Yugoslav diplomat to Germany and the newspaper editor for Vreme during World War II.

His father Cvetko Gregorić was the secretary of the Industrial Corporation in Belgrade, of Slovenian descent. Danilo Gregorić joined the movement of Dimitrije Ljotić, but soon left and joined the Yugoslav Radical Union of Milan Stojadinović, who knew his father. When President of the Government Dragiša Cvetković formed government, he took Gregorić, who knew perfect German, as one of his direct envoys to Germany. Gregorić was the intermediary between Cvetković and Joachim von Ribbentrop, and had a role in the Tripartite Pact talks. He was often in conflict with Foreign Minister Aleksandar Cincar-Marković. Gregorić sought to become the Minister for Propaganda, but did not succeed. When Cvetković changed his views on Germany, Gregorić was appointed the Deputy Commissioner of Vreme, subsequently the Commissioner and editor of the magazine. This was done according to the German government's wish. The tone of the magazine became pro-German, stressing that Yugoslavia needed to join the Axis powers. He was informed that tanks appeared in the streets, then left for Zemun, crossing the bridge, but was apprehended and imprisoned, on 27 March 1941, the day of the Yugoslav coup d'état. He was sentenced to 13 years of prison and forced labor on 16 August 1949 by the Communist Yugoslav court.

Works

References

Sources

20th-century Serbian people
Diplomats from Belgrade
Yugoslav diplomats
Serbian newspaper editors
Yugoslav editors
Germany–Yugoslavia relations
1900 births
1957 deaths
Yugoslav prisoners and detainees
Serbian people of Slovenian descent
Yugoslav people of World War II